Kyran Aiden Lofthouse (born 15 September 2000) is an English professional footballer who plays as a defender for National League club Woking.

Career

Oxford United
Born in Oxford, Lofthouse started his career with Oxford United, making his senior debut in a 2–1 EFL Trophy victory over Norwich City U21 on 3 September 2019.

He joined Oxford City on a one-month loan in November 2019, before his loan was extended by a further two months in December 2019. He returned to the club on another one-month loan in February 2020 after the previous deal expired. He appeared in 15 league matches for City in total, scoring three goals.

In May 2020, he was offered a new one-year contract by Oxford United.

On 26 October 2020, Lofthouse joined National League side Woking on a month-long loan, A day later, he went onto make his debut during a 1–0 away defeat to Boreham Wood, starting the fixture before being replaced by Max Kretzschmar in the 68th minute. His loan was subsequently extended by a further month in December and then again, in January 2021, until the end of the 2020–21 season. Proceeding this, just six days later, Lofthouse went onto score the winning penalty for the Cards during their FA Trophy fourth round penalty shootout triumph over Bromley. On 16 March 2021, Lofthouse registered his first goal for the club in a 1–1 home draw against Altrincham, putting the Cards ahead in the 18th minute before a late equaliser from Josh Hancock in the 92nd minute.

Woking
On 6 July 2021, Lofthouse returned to Woking on a permanent basis for an undisclosed fee, agreeing to a two-year deal. He made his first appearance of the 2021–22 campaign, during the Cards' 2–1 victory at Wealdstone, featuring for the full 90 minutes. Similarly to his first Woking goal, Lofthouse once again netted against Altrincham this time in February 2022 with a long range effort (which was eventually awarded as the club's goal of the season) to give The Cards a 2–0 lead, with the game ultimately finishing in a 2–2 draw. Within the same month and subsequently manager's, Alan Dowson final game in charge with the Surrey-based side, Lofthouse was forced off with a season-ending injury during their 2–0 defeat to Notts County. On 11 May 2022, Lofthouse was announced as The Woking News and Mail Young Player of the Year for the 2021–22 campaign.

Career statistics

References

External links
 
 

2000 births
Living people
English footballers
Footballers from Oxford
Association football forwards
Oxford United F.C. players
Oxford City F.C. players
Woking F.C. players
National League (English football) players